Jessie James is the debut album by the American country-pop singer-songwriter Jessie James. The album was released digitally on August 10, and physically on August 11 by Mercury Records. The album charted on the Billboard 200 at #23 on its debut week, selling about 18,575 copies.

The song "Wanted" was the album's lead single on April 14, 2009 and peaked at No. 40 on the Billboard Hot 100. The second single "I Look So Good (Without You)" was released on August 25, 2009, and peaked at No. 138 on the Billboard Hot Digital Songs chart, as well as No. 4 on the Billboard Bubbling Under Hot 100 chart. The third single "My Cowboy" was released on November 10, 2009.

The song "Blue Jeans" was featured on the soundtrack of the film Confessions of a Shopaholic.

Critical reception

The album received positive reviews according to Metacritic, scoring 73 out of 100. Michael Menachem of Billboard with regard to the many genres present on the album said that James had "a voice that seems to work with many genres". Stephen Thomas Erlewine of AllMusic thought the album was "inspired, original pop" but said it came short of being actual country music." Mikael Wood Entertainment Weekly said that "James falter[ed] on a handful of snoozy power ballads but play[ed] one heck of a small town kitten on up-tempo number."

Track listing

Personnel
Credits for Jessie James adapted from AllMusic

Mitch Allan- bass, engineer, guitar, producer, programming
Brian Barnett- drums
Julian Bunetta- bass, clapping, drums, engineer, footsteps, instrumentation, keyboards, mixing, producer, string arrangements, vocal producer
Ken Chastain- percussion, programming
Dorian Crozier- drums
Kara DioGuardi- vocals (background)
John Fields- bass, engineer, guitar, keyboards, mixing, producer, programming
Andrew Frampton- keyboards
Serban Ghenea- mixing
Mark Goldenberg- guitar
Tina Guo- cello
David Hodges- engineer, piano, producer, programming
Jessie James and the Odd Balls- clapping, footsteps, vocals
Mike Johnson- pedal steel
Stephen Lu- keyboards, programming

Tony Mardini- engineer
David & Phil Massey- A&R
Peter Mokran- mixing
John D. Norten- engineer
Carlos Oyanedel- mixing assistant
David Paich- keyboards
Brent Paschke- guitar
Katy Perry- vocals (background)
Eric Peterson- guitar, mixing
Brian Ray- guitar, guitar (acoustic), slide guitar
Tim Roberts- mixing assistant
Mick Schultz- producer
Adam Shoenfeld- guitar (electric)
Mark Smidt- horn
Phil Tan- mixing
Trey Vittetoe- engineer, mixing, performer, producer
Billy Watts- guitar
Glenn Worf- bass
Jonathan Yudkin- fiddle

Chart performance

References

2009 debut albums
Jessie James Decker albums
Mercury Records albums